Biancaea is a genus of flowering plants in the family Fabaceae. It belongs to the subfamily Caesalpinioideae and the tribe Caesalpinieae.

Species
Biancaea comprises the following species:
 Biancaea decapetala (Roth 1821) O. Deg. 1936—Mysore thorn (India)

 Biancaea godefroyana (Kuntze 1891) Molinari, Mayta & Sánchez Och. 2016
 Biancaea millettii (Hook. & Arn. 1841 [1833]) E. Gagnon & G. P. Lewis 2016
 Biancaea oppositifolia (Hattink 1974) Molinari & Mayta 2016
 Biancaea parviflora (Prain ex King 1974) Mayta & Molinari 2016
 Biancaea sappan (L. 1753) Tod. 1875—Sappanwood (Southeast Asia, Malay Archipelago)

References

External links 
 
 

Caesalpinieae
Fabaceae genera